Peter Allan Foster (born 19 December 1979) is an Australian politician.

Foster was formerly a Shire of Ashburton councillor representing the Tom Price ward. At the 2021 Western Australian state election, Foster was elected to the Western Australian Legislative Council as a Labor member for Mining and Pastoral.

References 

Living people
Members of the Western Australian Legislative Council
Australian Labor Party members of the Parliament of Western Australia
21st-century Australian politicians
1979 births